The St. Francis Xavier Cathedral  also called Ambon Cathedral Is the name given to a religious building affiliated with the Catholic Church which is located in the city of Ambon capital of the island of Ambon in the province of Maluku in the east of the Asian country of Indonesia.

History

The church honors the Spanish priest Francisco Javier thanks to whose work of evangelization the Christianity spread to the Moluccas.

The temple follows the Roman or Latin rite and is the mother church of the Diocese of Amboina (Dioecesis Amboinaënsis or Keuskupan Amboina) which began as an apostolic prefecture in 1902 and was elevated to its current status in 1961 by the bull "Quod Christus" of pope John XXIII.

It is under the pastoral responsibility of Bishop Seno Ngutra succeeding to Petrus Canisius Mandagi.

See also
Roman Catholicism in Indonesia
St. Francis Xavier

References

Roman Catholic cathedrals in Indonesia
Ambon, Maluku